Alsodes gargola, with the common name Tonchek spiny-chest frog, is a species of frog in the family Alsodidae. It is endemic to Argentina, where it occurs in northern Patagonia.

This species is a semi-aquatic frog living around alpine lakes and streams. It overwinters for 8 months of the year and the tadpoles overwinter beneath the ice and snow. The species is threatened by exotic trout, but the populations are probably not yet in decline. 

Alsodes gargola adults and tadpoles have the ability to tolerate and adapt to low conductivity water and extreme overwintering conditions indicating that it could have the highest tolerance to overwintering compared to other frogs.

References

Further reading
Logares, R. and Úbeda, C.A. 2006. First insights into the overwintering biology of Alsodes gargola frogs and tadpoles in harsh Andean-Patagonian alpine environments. Amphibia-Reptilia 27: 263–267.
Logares, R. and Úbeda, C.A. (2004): Alsodes gargola (Rana del Catedral). Overwintering Tadpoles. Herpetological Review 35: 368–369.
Logares, R., & Úbeda, C. (2006). First insights into the overwintering biology of Alsodes gargola frogs and tadpoles inhabiting harsh Andean-Patagonian alpine environments. Amphibia-Reptilia, 27(2), 263–267.
Baffico, G., & Úbeda, C. (2006). Larval diet of the frog Alsodes gargola (Leptodactylidae: Telmatobiinae) and some ecological considerations on its role in alpine and mountain aquatic environments in Patagonia. Amphibia-Reptilia, 27(2), 161–168.

gargola
Amphibians of Argentina
Amphibians of Patagonia
Endemic fauna of Argentina
Taxonomy articles created by Polbot
Amphibians described in 1970